Anne Newport, Baroness Torrington (? – 1735) was an eighteenth-century aristocrat and social reformer. 

She was the daughter of Robert Pierrepont and Anne Murray. 

She was the third wife of Thomas Newport, Baron Torrington, a barrister and Lord of the Treasury. They married on 8 July 1709, and made their home at Richmond House in Twickenham. Anne would continue to live after her husband died in 1719. She was a cousin of noted woman of letters Lady Mary Wortley Montagu.

On 14 April 1730, along with her friend, Frances Byron, she was one of the signatories to the Ladies' Petition for the Establishment of a Foundling Hospital, which would be presented by Thomas Coram to King George II in 1735. These ladies are now considered pioneers in demonstrating the 'Christian, virtuous and humanitarian aspects of such an endeavour and make it socially acceptable ... [and] one of the most fashionable charities of the day.

The extensive collection of fine art developed by the couple was inherited by Thomas' brother Lord Bradford. It is now on display at Weston Park in Shropshire.

References 

British philanthropists
English baronesses
British social reformers
1735 deaths